Jason Carter (born 11 January 2000) is an Australian rules footballer who last played for the Fremantle Football Club in the Australian Football League (AFL).

Football career 
Originally from the small town of Wyndham in the Kimberley region of Western Australia, he played a few colts games for Claremont in 2017 whilst attending school at Aquinas College, Perth. He also played for Western Australia at the 2016 Under 16 National Championships, where he was named in the All-Australian team. He was selected to play in the 2017 AFL Under 18 Championships but injured his knee during a trial game and was unable to compete. He was then invited to join Fremantle's Next Generation Academy at the beginning of 2018, and switched to play for Fremantle's affiliate team, Peel Thunder.

He was drafted to Fremantle's rookie list via the Next Generation Academy (NGA) system at the 2018 AFL Draft, becoming the first NGA player to be recruited by Fremantle, and the first player from Wyndham to be on an AFL list.

After spending the most of the 2019 season playing for Peel in the West Australian Football League (WAFL), Carter was elevated to the senior list in July.  In August, he made his AFL debut in Fremantle's upset win over Geelong.

In the 2020 season that was interrupted by the coronavirus outbreak, Carter along with Fremantle teammates were caught
attending a house party in breach of WA government protocols. Later in August, Carter was caught by Police drink driving and was given a club based suspension. Carter asked to be released from his contract and was delisted.

References

External links

WAFL Statistics

2000 births
Living people
Fremantle Football Club players
Peel Thunder Football Club players
Australian rules footballers from Western Australia
Indigenous Australian players of Australian rules football
People educated at Aquinas College, Perth